Holtzman or Haltzman is a surname. Notable people with the surname include:

Bob Holtzman (born 1972), American television personality
Elizabeth Holtzman (born 1941), American lawyer, NYC Comptroller, and political figure
Glenn Holtzman (1930–1980), American football player
Harry Holtzman (1912–1987), American artist
Jerome Holtzman (1926–2008), American sportswriter
John W. Holtzman (1858–1942), American political figure
Ken Holtzman (born 1945), American baseball player
Lester Holtzman (1913–2002), American political figure
Linda Joy Holtzman (fl. 1960s–present), American rabbi and scholar
Marc Holtzman (born c. 1955), American international investment bank figure
Scott Holtzman (born 1983), American martial artist
Shay Holtzman (born 1974), Israeli footballer
Wayne H. Holtzman (1923–2019), American psychoanalyst
Wilhelm Holtzman, birth name of German classical scholar Wilhelm Xylander (1532–1576)
Willy Holtzman (born 1952), American author, screenwriter
Zac Holtzman (fl. 1980s–present), American musician

Haltzman
Scott Haltzman (born 1960), American psychiatrist, counselor, author

Fiction or other uses
Holtzman effect, a fictional scientific phenomenon in the Dune universe created by Frank Herbert
Holtzman Inkblot Technique, a psychoanalytical tool
Schlesinger v. Holtzman, a 1973 US Supreme Court case addressing the War Powers Clause of the Constitution
Tio Holtzman, fictional character in Frank Herbert's "Dune" universe
Holtzman effect, fictional physical effect of crucial importance attributed to the above

See also
 Holtzmann
 Holzmann
 Holzman
 Holz
 Holtz

Germanic-language surnames
Jewish surnames